The 2016 Four Days of Dunkirk (French: Quatre Jours de Dunkerque 2016) was the 62nd edition of the Four Days of Dunkirk cycling stage race. It started on 4 May in Dunkirk and ended on 8 May again in Dunkirk.

Teams
The start list includes 18 teams (3 UCI WorldTeams, 10 Professional Continental Teams, and 5 Continental Teams).

Route

Stages

Stage 1
4 May 2016 — Dunkirk to Gravelines,

Stage 2
5 May 2016 — Aniche to Aniche,

Stage 3
6 May 2016 — Béthune to Saint-Pol-sur-Ternoise,

Stage 4
7 May 2016 — Audruicq to Cassel, Nord,

Stage 5
8 May 2016 — Hondschoote to Dunkerque,

Classification leadership table

References

External links 

 

Four Days of Dunkirk
Four Days of Dunkirk
Four Days of Dunkirk